Superman: The Animated Series (often shortened as STAS) is an American superhero animated television series based on the DC Comics character Superman. It was produced by Warner Bros. Animation and originally aired on Kids' WB from September 6, 1996 to February 12, 2000. It was the second series in the DC Animated Universe after Batman: The Animated Series, and like its predecessor it has been acclaimed for its thematic complexity, writing, voice acting, maturity and modernization of the title character's comic-book mythos.

Overview
Premiering ten years after the 1986 reboot of the Superman comic-book character, the animated series paid tribute to both the classic Superman of old and the newer "modern" Superman. For instance, the depiction of Krypton reflects the older idealized version in the Silver Age of Comic Books. The scope of Superman's powers reflects the more restrained contemporary concept as developed by John Byrne, in that the superhero has to struggle to perform spectacular feats. However, Clark Kent is shown to be open, if quietly, self-confident, without jeopardizing his secrets. This is similar to the depiction of Batman's alter-ego, Bruce Wayne, in Batman: The Animated Series.

Midway through the series' run, it was combined with The New Batman Adventures to become The New Batman/Superman Adventures. The characters of Superman and Batman were then spun off into a new animated series, Justice League. This series also featured other popular DC Comics characters, including Wonder Woman, The Flash, Green Lantern, Martian Manhunter, and Hawkgirl. It spawned a sequel series entitled Justice League Unlimited.

Several episodes involve Superman encountering other superheroes in the DC universe. Batman appears the most often, along with several of his allies and antagonists from The New Batman Adventures, including The Joker, Robin, Alfred Pennyworth, Harley Quinn, Bane, Commissioner Gordon, and Ra's al Ghul, among others. In addition, other episodes feature The Flash (alongside the Weather Wizard), Green Lantern (Kyle Rayner) (with Sinestro and the Green Lantern Corps), Aquaman, and Doctor Fate (along with his wife Inza and Karkull).

Voice cast

Episodes

Development and production
In the time between the initial end of Batman, Steven Spielberg approached Bruce Timm about his admiration for his previous show while being curious about an adventure cartoon. Spielberg asked Timm and his crew to come up with concepts for him to look at (one of these ideas eventually sprung into Freakazoid!, which involved a crazed superhero, although Timm had aimed for a straightforward hero show rather than overt comedy). At any rate, Warner Bros was anticipating a feature film of Superman and thus wanted to make a television series to go alongside it, which led Jean MacCurdy to approach Timm about the idea of doing a series on Superman, which he agreed to. Initially, Timm struggled with finding the visual style, to the point where he thought of trying to aim for a retro feel similar to the Fleischer Studios Superman-cartoon (as his prior Batman series had touches of inspiration from said studio). An original character design sheet showed the characters in a stylized 1940s/1950s style (not unlike that of the live-action Adventures of Superman TV series); however, Timm decided that he could not compete against the "perfection" of the past, although he would utilize influence from classic deco, which he described as "bright, futuristic, optimistic, ocean liner art deco...much more in line with Superman's character." As with the first season of Batman, the opening theme sequence of Superman lacked an on-screen title. Also like Batman, the opening theme for Superman lacked any lyrics, instead of being an instrumental piece played over various scenes from the series. The character design for the title character was inspired not by one of the comics but instead The Mighty Hercules (1963) with the design of the title character.

Koko Enterprise Co., LTD., TMS-Kyokuchi Corporation, Dong Yang Animation Co., LTD and Group TAC contributed some of the animation for this series. During the series, Timm and his crew began using TMS-Kyokuchi Corporation as an outsourced pre-production unit as well as an animation unit, and TMS storyboarded and directed episodes themselves. TMS also did the digital black hole effects in the episode "Absolute Power," although Koko and Dong Yang did the background and character animation. Like the previous shows, the animation on the series was done in traditional cels. The latter series Batman Beyond used cel animation in the first 26 episodes, it was then switched to digital ink and paint in the second half of season 2.

One noticeable aspect of the series carried over from Byrne's work was Superman's powers were significantly downplayed compared to his comic book counterpart. Whereas in the comic he could lift millions or billions of tons effortlessly, this version struggled lifting trucks, construction equipment, roadways, etc. The writers admit that he was made as strong as the story permitted. His durability was also considerably less than while bullets bounced off him, heavier ordnance like high caliber bullets, cannons, and missiles caused him pain or discomfort (but it is often due only to the recoil, such weapons are still rather inefficient, only slowing him down). He's also recurrently shown being sensitive to electricity, high-voltage electric currents being able to cause him a great deal of pain (for this reason, Livewire is one of his most formidable enemies in this animated series), and in one episode lasers proved capable of blinding him temporarily. Despite this greatly reduced durability, he's very rarely shown injured or bleeding. His lung capacity seems also quite limited since he needs special equipment to go underwater or in outer space.

In addition, the ship that carries the infant Kal-El to Earth is designed to have a pilot, and the autopilot used instead was programmed to land smoothly upon reaching its destination. This was done so that the ship is in perfect working condition during Superman's adulthood and could be used as his mode of long-range transportation in space.

Season two was originally scheduled to run 26 episodes, but it was extended to 28 episodes in order to accommodate a two-part story introducing Supergirl.

While the series adapts many villains from Superman's rogues gallery in the comics, the primary antagonists that he faces throughout the show and the DCAU continuity as a whole are Lex Luthor, Brainiac and Darkseid.

In the series, the writers decided to alter Brainiac's origin by making him an artificial intelligence supercomputer from Krypton, instead of the planet Colu like the comics, to give him a more personal rivalry with Superman. While the producers of the show found Brainiac's character and abilities interesting in the comics, they disliked his original design so they drastically altered his appearance; his green artificial skin was replaced with an icy-blue coloration, and the rest of his outfit became a mix of purple and grey rather than pink and black. Corey Burton's vocal performance as Brainiac was done in a cold, low-affect style similar to HAL 9000 in the Space Odyssey films and the 'Control Voice' heard during the opening narration of The Outer Limits. before being cast as Brainiac, Burton also read for the parts of Superman and Lex Luthor.

To pay tribute to Jack Kirby's Fourth World creations, the show introduced the New God Darkseid as Superman's archenemy. In contrast to the character's less than faithful adaptations in Super Friends: The Legendary Super Powers Show and The Super Powers Team: Galactic Guardians in the 1980s, Superman: The Animated Series portrays Darkseid as the evil and omnipotent cosmic dictator originally envisioned by Kirby in the comics. Michael Ironside's vocal performance was initially lowered for Darkseid's first two appearances in the series, though this modulation was later dropped in favor of Ironside's natural voice. The character is notable for being the only villain the DCAU's version of Superman is willing to kill, and Darkseid's actions in the series finale in addition to their rivalry become a recurring staple throughout subsequent spin-off shows.

Comic adaptation

As with the majority of shows in DC animated universe, Superman: The Animated Series received a comic adaptation taking place in the same universe, that ran from 1996 to 2002, with 68 issues, an annual and a special issue featuring Lobo. Paul Dini wrote the first issue of the series, followed by Scott McCloud, Mark Millar and Evan Dorkin. Among the artists that contributed to the series are Ty Templeton, Rick Burchett, Mike Manley, Aluir Amancio, Min S.Ku and Neil Vokes.

Home media
Superman The Last Son Of Krypton compiling the first 3 episodes of the series was released on February 3, 2004 on DVD. Much like Batman: The Animated Series and other Warner Bros. cartoons adapted from popular DC Comic books, Superman: The Animated Series was released on DVD January 25, 2005, though it did not receive the same disc transfer as Batman did (the second disc of each volume was given the Side A/B treatment). The DVDs present the series' episodes in their airing order along with special features. Volume Two was released on December 6, 2005, and Volume Three was released on June 20, 2006. On November 24, 2009, Warner Home Video released Superman: The Complete Animated Series, a 7-disc boxed set that includes all 54 episodes of the series as well as extensive bonus features. On October 26, 2021 Warner Bros. Home Entertainment released Superman: The Complete Animated Series on Blu-ray, also including all 54 episodes and bonus materials.

A direct-to-DVD feature, Superman: Brainiac Attacks was released in 2006, although it is not considered to be part of DCAU continuity, despite featuring the same character designs as Superman: The Animated Series, as well as both Tim Daly and Dana Delany reprising their voice roles as Superman and Lois Lane, respectively.

Altered sequence in "Apokolips...Now! Part II"

"Apokolips...Now! Part II" was later altered from its original airing on February 7, 1998. Originally the Dan Turpin funeral at the episode's end was a true homage to late New Gods creator Jack Kirby and featured several of his comic creations as attendees to the funeral including Nick Fury, the Fantastic Four, Big Barda, Scott Free, Orion and others, alongside Kirby's friends and fans Mark Evanier, Bruce Timm, Paul Dini, Alex Ross, his father Norman Ross and Stan Lee. These characters and persons were later removed and the scene pacing was re-edited for subsequent airings and its DVD release on Superman: The Animated Series Volume 3 Disc 3. The original sketches for this scene can be found at Michael Eury's book The Krypton Companion published by TwoMorrow's Publishing. Neither DC nor Warner ever commented on the decision to alter this particular scene, but it has been speculated that copyright issues regarding the use of the likenesses of Marvel Comics characters and the long-time rivalry between the two companies might have motivated the deletion. On March 17, 2021, Superman: The Animated Series was made available in high-definition on the streaming service HBO Max. They used the original broadcast version of this episode, reinstating the original mourners at Dan Turpin's funeral. The original version also made it to the official Blu-ray set later that same year.

Music
As with Batman: The Animated Series, Shirley Walker was in charge of the series' music. Walker wrote the series theme and composed themes for various characters, as well as scoring six episodes herself – "Father's Day," "The Hand of Fate," "Obsession," "Absolute Power" and the two-parter "Legacy." Unlike the previous series, only four other composers worked on the series – Kristopher Carter, Harvey R. Cohen, Michael McCuistion, and Lolita Ritmanis. Almost every episode had a completely original score; very few reused music from previous shows, and only one episode ("Superman's Pal," credited to Carter, McCuistion, Ritmanis, and Walker) was entirely "scored" with tracked material.

On January 28, 2014, La-La Land Records released a 4-disc compilation of music from the series, collecting 20 complete episode scores, including those of the "World's Finest" three-parter, the "Apokolips... Now!" two-parter, the "Little Girl Lost" two-parter and "In Brightest Day...". It is a limited edition release of 3000 units and can be purchased through the label's website.

If sales of this release improve significantly, La-La Land Records will produce a second volume.

Track listing
Disc One (Total Time 78:59)
Superman: The Animated Series – Main Title (Shirley Walker) 1:07

The Last Son of Krypton Part I (Lolita Ritmanis)
Krypton Opening/Monster Attack 2:37
Family Theme 1:12
Earthquake/Jor-El Appeals* 1:59
Brainiac Confrontation* 2:14
Jor-El Escapes Arrest/Jor-El Outside 1:52
Decision to Send Kal-El 3:01
Brainiac Leaves Krypton*/Kal-El Leaves Krypton*/** 1:43

The Last Son of Krypton Part II (Michael McCuistion)
Recap (The Last Son of Krypton, Part II)*1:07
Kal-El Lands on Earth/Couple Find Kal-El 2:09
Clark's Abilities/Clark Meets His Parents 3:19
Clark's First Flight*** 2:24
News Program Source:32
Industrial Film Source 1:10
Superman Rescues Lois*/Missile Hits Airliner* 3:13

The Last Son of Krypton Part III (Harvey R. Cohen)
Recap (The Last Son of Krypton, Part III)* 1:00
Superman Saves Airliner* 2:39
Clark's Identity Crisis* :56
Lois Abducts Bibbo/Lois Meets John 1:46
Clark Recognizes Ship*/Orders to Kill Lois* 2:05
Robot Loose in City* 2:08
Lois Gets Story* 1:03

Fun and Games (Lolita Ritmanis)
Family Pet 2:00
Titano Lost and Found 2:06
Monkey Business/Babysitting With Fleas/Bacteria Attack* 2:07
Jimmy Runs Away* 1:01
Monkeys on the Loose*/Superman Cages Lions 1:54
Titano at the Dock 1:53
Titano/Amusement Park* 1:37
Superman vs. Titano 1:39
Pop Goes the Weasel (Traditional, arr. L. Ritmanis) :37
Titano Relocated 1:13

Tools of the Trade (Kristopher Carter)
Tank Attack* 3:04
Meet Kanto/Mannheim Gets Gloves 1:22
Train Wreck/Train Robbery 1:31
To the Rescue* 1:44
Turpin Resigns 1:11
Prisoner Turpin/Superman Finds Turpin/Turpin Saves Superman* 3:55
Superman Thanks Turpin*/ Planet Apokolips* 1:20

Tools of the Trade – Bonus Track (Kristopher Carter)
Train Wreck/Train Robbery (Alternate) 1:51

Superman: The Animated Series – Video End Credits (Shirley Walker) 2:37

 THE LAST SON OF KRYPTON, PART III – Bonus Music-And-Effects Track
Superman Destroys Robot*(H. Cohen)/Superman Spurns Lex*(M. McCuistion)/Brainiac Returns*(L. Ritmanis) 3:07

Disc Two (Total Time 78:59)

The New Batman/Superman Adventures – Main Title (Shirley Walker) 1:05

World's Finest Part I (Michael McCuistion)
Closing Time*/Joke in the Box Source*/ Batman Takes Evidence* 1:37
Terrorists on Plane* 1:11
Lois Talks to Superman/Lois Beats Herself Up :58
Joker Abducts Lex 1:20
Lex & Joker Make a Deal/Lois Meets Bruce 1:42
Joker Undoes Carlini 1:27
WayneLex T-7 :52
First Dance 1:11
Batman Shows Up/Binko's Bad Night*/Batman Bugs Superman* 3:29

World's Finest Part II (Michael McCuistion)
Recap (World's Finest, Part II) :38
Bruce and Lois Go Out/Joker Crashes Date/Joker's Plan 2:23
Batwing Takes Off*/Superman Meets Joker* 1:39
Batman Saves Superman* 3:08
Batman Makes His Exit:29
Harley Cheers Up Joker/Lex Meets With Joker 2:01
Batman Pays Lex a Visit/Superman Flies By* 1:14
Jet Pac Transportation*/Joker Uses Robot 1:12

World's Finest Part III (Michael McCuistion & Lolita Ritmanis)
Recap (World's Finest, Part III) (M. McCuistion) :35
Ship in Distress (M. McCuistion) 1:45
Batman Drops In/ Batman Unmasked/ Superman Stops Robot (M. McCuistion) 1:30
Batman Has to Leave/Lex Sets Up Joker (M. McCuistion) 1:28
Arrival at Lab*/Robots Battle Superman*/Batman Gets to Lexwing*(L. Ritmanis) 6:04
Lexwing Crashes*(M. McCuistion) 2:22
Bruce Returns to Gotham* (M. McCuistion) 1:08

Mxyzpixilated (Harvey R. Cohen)
Stopping Traffic/Reading the Comics/The Statue Moves 2:43
Chickens/Setting the Rules 3:23
A Close Shave*/Proofreading/Apartment Source 3:52
Building Battle Suit 1:54
Clark's Calendar/Office Menagerie/Aerial Chase* 4:50
Why Am I Eating This? :56

Father's Day (Shirley Walker)
Scream Machine Lands/Superman vs. Machine 3:56
Desaad's Tricky Plan 1:26
Kalibak Comes to Earth/Kalibak Trashes Minerva 1:56
Kalibak Ambushes Superman:48
Superman vs. Kalibak/Fight on Train Track 2:04
Battle Continues/Power Struggle 3:25
Darkseid Beams Superman 2:21

Father's Day – Bonus Track (Shirley Walker)
Restaurant Source 1:07

The New Batman/Superman Adventures – End Credits (Shirley Walker) :35

Disc Three (Total Time 78:36)

Superman: The Animated Series – Twenty-Second Promo (Shirley Walker) :26

In Brightest Day (Michael McCuistion)
Kyle Catches Thief :58
Abin Makes Ring Choose/Ring Chooses Kyle* 3:27
Kyle Is Green Lantern:32
Superman Finds Abin/Sinestro Wants the Ring 2:22
Superman Meets Guardian:44
Kyle Saves Little Girl/Fight Continues 3:02
Superman Helps Council/Fight for Power/Kyle Wins Battle 4:05
Kyle's Their Man 1:16

A Little Piece of Home (Kristopher Carter)
Break-In at the Museum* 2:14
Lex Sees Superman Weak*/Waiting for a Reaction:51
Lois Gets a Phone Call/Steal Treasury Plates*/No Deal with Lex* 5:31
Lois Visits S.T.A.R. Labs/Superman vs. Dinosaur*/Superman Throws Rock* 4:26

Livewire (Harvey R. Cohen)
Wake-Up Source 1:30
Construction Crane/Prevents Crane Accident* 2:42
Centennial Park Source 1:15
Leslie Becomes Livewire* 1:37
Livewire Checks Out :59
Metamorphosis Complete 1:07
She Turns Off the Light/Tower of Power Is Back 1:31
Superman Averts Planes* :59
Livewire Gets Recharged*/Caution Sign 3:41

Apokolips Now! Part I (Kristopher Carter)
Maggie Brings Cash :51
Hovercraft Steals Truck/Superman Fights Craft/Superman & Broken Glass 2:56
Darkseid Arrives*/Orion Arrives 2:10
New Genesis & Apokolips* 2:55
Air Base Battle/Orion Zaps Hovercraft/Orion Wins at Air Base* 3:20
Mannheim at Power Plant :33
Orion Goes Back 1:24
Power Plant Explodes*/Superman Sees Explosion 1:20

Apokolips Now! Part II (Kristopher Carter)
Recap (Apokolips Now! Part II) 1:00
Hamilton Has Bad News 1:06
Meet Steppenwolf :26
Steppenwolf Arrives*/Missiles Bring Down Superman 2:11
Demons Take Over City/Attack of the Demons* 2:01
Superman Puts Out Fire* 1:44
Darkseid Appears* 1:00
Dan Fights Demons* 1:39
Apokoliptic War Machine/Darkseid Takes Control* 1:14
Orion to the Rescue*/Dan's Funeral 4:42

The New Batman/Superman Adventures – Twenty-Second Promo :26 (Shirley Walker)

Disc Four (Total Time 79:00)

Superman: The Animated Series – Ten-Second Promo (Shirley Walker) :16

Little Girl Lost Part I (Lolita Ritmanis)
Journey Through Space 2:43
Superman Enters Chamber/Kala's Story/Superman Finds Kara 3:02
Kara Flies 1:17
Intergang Interest/Intergang Arrives :28
Gang Fights Superman* 2:38
Granny Knows Best/Kara Joins Jimmy:48
Following Gang Into Building:45
Granny Takes Control**** 2:52

Little Girl Lost Part II (Lolita Ritmanis)
Recap (Little Girl Lost, Part II) :53
Surrounded 1:53
Superman Is Captured*/Kara Leaves for Apokolips 3:23
Kara Arrives on Apokolips**** 1:18
Kara Escapes Parademons**** 2:00
Superman Kneels*/Darkseid's Prediction/Get Back Home* 3:31
Stop Comet*/Superman Catches 2:50
Supergirl's OK 1:07

Feeding Time (Michael McCuistion)
Toxic Waste* 2:28
Rudy Becomes Toxic/Goo on Superman's Finger* 1:24
Parasite Saps Police* 1:16
Parasite Visits LeBeau*/Parasite Saps Superman's Energy* 2:23
Parasite Can't Rob Bank :32
Parasite Attacks Clark/His New Meal Plan* :49
Jimmy Gets Idea 2:19
Superman Saves Jimmy/Saved by a Bug* 2:25

Legacy Part I (Shirley Walker)
Planet Attack 2:20
Leader Revealed 1:27
Kal-El's Dream 1:20
Brainwashed 2:01
Supergirl Chases Robot 2:01
Lex Knows :34
Ready for Battle :49
Kal-El Attacks Earth :57
Lex Kills Kal-El 3:53

Legacy Part II (Shirley Walker)
Recap (Legacy, Part II) :28
Taken Prisoner 1:37
Superman Tries to Escape 2:09
Lois Springs Superman*** 3:47
Lois Comforts Superman*** 2:08
Return to Apokolips 1:20
Superman vs. Furies 1:01
Superman vs. Darkseid 2:16
Darkseid Prevails 2:07
Lois and Superman :46

Superman: The Animated Series – End Credits (Shirley Walker) :35

Video games
Superman 64, released for the Nintendo 64 console in 1999, was the first video game to be produced based upon the series, however it is considered to be one of the worst Superman video games and worst games ever. A second video game, Superman: Shadow of Apokolips was released in 2002 for the PlayStation 2 and GameCube consoles. It was produced by a different company, and was described as "a respectable but average superhero game."

Awards and nominations

Notes

References

External links

 Official DC comics Site
 
 
 Superman: The Animated Series at The World's Finest

 
Animated Superman television series
1990s American animated television series
1996 American television series debuts
2000 American television series endings
2000s American animated television series
1990s American science fiction television series
2000s American science fiction television series
American children's animated action television series
American children's animated adventure television series
American children's animated science fantasy television series
American children's animated superhero television series
Television shows adapted into comics
Television shows adapted into video games
YTV (Canadian TV channel) original programming
Kids' WB original shows
Toonami
Animated television shows based on DC Comics
Television series by Warner Bros. Animation
The WB original programming